Evan Thomas (February 17, 1891 – 1982), also known as Peter Evan Thomas was a Canadian-born British character actor, whose career spanned both the silent and sound film eras. He began his career in England, in Lady Windermere's Fan, written by Oscar Wilde.

Born Elystan Owen Evan Thomas in Vancouver, he appeared in silent films in Great Britain. He worked in both Hollywood and England beginning in 1930, before returning permanently to the British film industry after 1946. Over his fifty-year career, he would appear in dozens of films, usually in small roles, although he did have several featured performances, as in 1928's Warned Off, and 1935's Lend Me Your Husband.

Filmography

(Per AFI and BFI databases)

Lady Windermere's Fan (1916)
Wisp o' The Woods (1919)
The Starting Point (1919)
Once Aboard the Lugger (1920)
The Constant Nymph (1928)
Warned Off (1928)
Inside the Lines  (1930)
Women Who Play (1932)
Tin Gods (1932)
The Girl from Maxim's  (1933)  
Mrs. Dane's Defence (1933)
Ask Beccles (1934)
The Scarlet Pimpernel (1934)
Lend Me Your Husband (1935)
Spy of Napoleon (1936)
Knight Without Armour (1937)
The High Command (1937)
O.H.M.S. (1937)
For Valour (1937)
The Buccaneer  (1938)   	
Bulldog Drummond in Africa  (1938)
Bulldog Drummond's Peril  (1938)   	
Arrest Bulldog Drummond  (1938)   	
Kidnapped  (1938)
If I Were King  (1938)
Lord Jeff  (1938)
The Little Princess  (1939)
The Hound of the Baskervilles  (1939)
North West Mounted Police  (1940)
British Intelligence  (1940)
The Blonde from Singapore  (1941)
One Night in Lisbon  (1941)
The Royal Mounted Patrol  (1941)
They Met in Bombay  (1941)
A Yank in the R.A.F.  (1941)
Drums of Fu Manchu (1943)
First Comes Courage  (1943)
The Man from Down Under  (1943)
Two Tickets to London  (1943)
Appointment in Berlin  (1943)
Frenchman's Creek  (1944)
Our Hearts Were Young and Gay  (1944)
The Uninvited  (1944)
Diamond Horseshoe  (1945)
My Name Is Julia Ross  (1945)   	
The Picture of Dorian Gray  (1945)
Kitty  (1946)
Rendezvous 24  (1946)
Sweetheart of Sigma Chi  (1946)
Tomorrow Is Forever  (1946)
Children Galore (1954)
Vanishing Act (1962)
The Sporting Chance (1964)
Women in Crisis My Grandmother (1964)
Whatever Happened to George Foster? (1965)

References

External links
 
 

1891 births
1982 deaths
20th-century Canadian male actors
Canadian male stage actors
British male silent film actors
Canadian male silent film actors
Male actors from Vancouver
Canadian emigrants to England
Canadian expatriates in England
British expatriate male actors in the United States